Tig (ትግ) is a prefix to several words, which sometimes causes confusion amongst indigenous Eritrean and Ethiopians as well as foreigners. Moreover, there is a need for clarifying the categories that are attached to the prefix as there are several points of overlap in the linguistic variations of the words. Thus demystification of the typology, phonetics, and syntax is needed for all variations of the Ethiopian/Eritrean prefix across the indices of Region (Territory), Language (Linguistic), and Ethnicity (Peoples) – See Figure 1.

Definitions

Tigrinya
1. (Language) Tigrinya language, also spelled Tigrigna, is a Semitic language spoken by the Tigray people of northern Ethiopia and Tigrinyas of central and southern Eritrea. Written records include religious texts prepared by mission societies and an increasing number of textbooks and literary works. The language is closely related to Geʿez, the ancient language of Ethiopia, and to the Tigré language. There were some 5.8 million speakers in the early 21st century.

Tigray(i)
2. (Region) Tigray, also spelled Tegray, Tigrai, historical region, northern Ethiopia. The region is drained by the Tekeze and Gash (Mareb) rivers.

Tigrayan/Tigrean/Tegaru
3. (Ethnicity) Denotes to Tigrayans.Pertains to Ethiopia in particular. As per Ethiopia's ethnic federalism system (since 1991). Pertains to the northernmost region's ethnicity.

Tigre/Tigrayit
4. (Language/Ethnicity) Tigre, refers to an Ethnolinguistic group inhabiting northwestern Eritrea and limited areas of neighboring Sudan. The Tigre speak Tigré, a Semitic language related to ancient Geʿez and to modern Tigrinya, the language of the Tigray people.

Tigrinya(s)
5. (Language/Ethnicity/Region) Pertains to the Central- South Eritrean and Northern Ethiopian ethnolinguistic group, i.e. Tigrinya-speaking highlanders.

(6. is missing in the diagram.)

Tigrigna(s)†
7. (Ethnicity) The Tigrinya are Eritrea's largest ethnic group, accounting for approximately 50 percent of the country's population. They live mainly in the Eritrean highlands (Kabessa) in the provinces of Hamasien, Akeleguzay, and Seraye. The highlands are the most populated region of Eritrea and are among the country's most fertile areas.

Tigré‡
8. (Language) An alternative term, typically Amharic for Tigrinya-speakers.

Tigurats/Tigrigni
9. Of an ethnographic identification for Tigrigna and Tigre ethnic groups.

Notes
The Eritrean version of the language is spelled as "Tigrigna" or "ትግርኛ" and pronounced differently implying the actual dialect adhered by Eritrean Tigrigna speakers. Similarly, the Ethiopian version of the language is spelled "Tigrinya" or "ትግርና" and pronounced in line with the dialect adhered by Tigrinya speakers in Ethiopia.

†There is no standard term to describe the Tigrinya-speaking population of Eritrea and Ethiopia.

‡In the Amharic language a Tigrinya speaker is identified as Tigre. In the Tigray region, he/she is identified as Tigraway (male) and Tigrawit (female). In Eritrea, the Tigrinya population inside Eritrea is identified as Tigrinya. (Negash and Tronvoll 2001)

References

Tigrinya language